Västra Karups IF is a Swedish football club located in Västra Karup.

Background
Västra Karups IF currently plays in two divisions each for men and women. For men they currently play in Division 4 and 6 Skåne Nordvästra which are the sixth and eighth tier of Swedish football. For women they currently play in Division 2 and 4. They play their home matches at the Västra Karups IP in Västra Karup.

The club is affiliated to Skånes Fotbollförbund.

Season to season

Footnotes

External links
 Västra Karups IF – Official website

Football clubs in Skåne County